Fufu (Tanzanian ward) is an administrative ward in the Dodoma Rural district of the Dodoma Region of Tanzania. In 2016 the Tanzania National Bureau of Statistics report there were 3,770 people in the ward, from 3,469 in 2012.

See also
Dodoma Region

References

Wards of Dodoma Region